This is a list of diplomatic missions of Pakistan, excluding honorary consulates. As the fifth-most populous country and the second-most populous country in the Muslim world, Pakistan has an extensive and large diplomatic network around the world.

As a member of the Commonwealth of Nations, Pakistani diplomatic missions in the capitals of other Commonwealth members are known as High Commissions.

In November 2021 Pakistan announced establishment of five new diplomatic missions in Africa as a part of its "Engaged Africa policy" which included missions in Mali, Uganda, Burkina Faso, Benin and Djibouti.

Current missions

Africa

Americas

Asia

Europe

Oceania

Multilateral organizations

Gallery

Closed missions

Africa

Americas

Asia

See also

 List of diplomatic missions in Pakistan
 Foreign relations of Pakistan
 Diplomatic missions in Karachi
 Public diplomacy of Pakistan

Notes

References

External links

 Ministry of Foreign Affairs of Pakistan

 
Pakistan
Diplomatic missions